Charles Hope (born 1970) is a former offensive guard in the National Football League.

Biography
Hope was born Charles Edward Hope on March 12, 1970 in Wilmington, Delaware and is a graduate of William Penn High School in New Castle, Delaware. Actively cheers for the Buffalo Bills.

Career
Hope played with the Green Bay Packers during the 1994 NFL season. He played college football at Central State University.

See also
List of Green Bay Packers players

References

1970 births
Living people
Players of American football from Wilmington, Delaware
Green Bay Packers players
American football offensive guards
Central State Marauders football players